Riley Thilthorpe (born 7 July 2002) is an Australian rules footballer who plays for the Adelaide Football Club in the Australian Football League (AFL). He was recruited by the Adelaide Football Club with the 2nd draft pick in the 2020 AFL draft.

AFL career 
Thilthorpe debuted in round 6 of the 2021 AFL season, as he was impressive with 16 disposals and kicked 5 goals. His 5 goals is the highest ever by a Crows debutant. Jason Dunstall commented, "the emergence of a future star."

In round 13, against St Kilda, Thilthorpe kicked the match winning goal over his head on his opposite boot in the last minute of the game. It completed Adelaide's 36-point comeback. To honour his 3-goal performance and late heroics, Thilthorpe was rewarded with a much anticipated NAB AFL Rising Star nomination for Round 13.

Statistics 
''Statistics are correct to the end of the 2022 season.
|- style="background-color: #EAEAEA"
! scope="row" style="text-align:center" | 2021
|
| 7 || 14 || 18 || 10 || 94 || 58 || 152 || 44 || 19 || 1.29 || 0.71 || 6.71 || 4.14 || 10.86 || 3.14 || 1.36
|- style="background-color: #EAEAEA"
! scope="row" style="text-align:center" | 2022
|
| 7 || 11 || 8 || 7 || 70 || 43 || 113 || 49 || 24 || 0.73 || 0.64 || 6.36 || 3.91 || 10.27 || 4.45 || 2.18
|- class="sortbottom"
! colspan=3| Career
! 25
! 26
! 17
! 164
! 101
! 265
! 93
! 43
! 1.04
! 0.68
! 6.56
! 4.04
! 10.6
! 3.72
! 1.72
|}

References

External links 

2002 births
Living people
Adelaide Football Club players
West Adelaide Football Club players
Australian rules footballers from South Australia